Jarrett/Favre Motorsports was an American stock car racing team owned by NASCAR driver Dale Jarrett and National Football League quarterback Brett Favre. The team raced in the Busch Series from 1999 to 2000.

Busch Series

Founding 
Brett Favre signed on as part-owner of the team in early 1999 to couple with Dale Jarrett.

Car No. 11 History 

The team debuted with Kenny Irwin Jr. at Texas Motor Speedway in March 1999.  Irwin posted a fifth in that first race, which was coincidentally the team's best finish in competition.  Irwin made four more starts, posting another fifth at Dover International Speedway. Team owner Jarrett made one start at Darlington Speedway and fell victim to overheating. Jason Jarrett, Dale's son, made one start at Gateway Motorsports Park and finished 25th, one lap down. Steve Grissom made four starts near the end of the season, recording a best finish of 13th at Memphis International Raceway.

In 2000, the team shifted its focus to the younger Jarrett, with Rayovac returning as primary sponsor.  Jarrett struggled mightily in the first nineteen races of the season, posting his only top-20 finish at Daytona International Speedway, crashing out of three races, and failing to qualify for eight other races, making for only eleven starts.  To try to help performance, the team switched from Pontiacs to Chevrolets and changed crew chiefs from Wes Ward to Rick Bowman.  However, neither of the changes seemed to improve performance, so journeyman driver Hut Stricklin was hired to run two races, at Pikes Peak International Raceway and Gateway. Stricklin only qualified for the race at Pikes Peak and finished 28th. Stricklin also attempted the fall race for the team at Phoenix International Raceway, but did not qualify.  Jarrett returned to the car after the Gateway race, but failed to qualify for three more races and posted a best finish of 22nd at Bristol Motor Speedway, even as Verizon Wireless came on board as an associate sponsor.

In September 2000, Rayovac announced that they would not renew their sponsorship into 2001.  Plagued by poor performance, Jarrett/Favre Motorsports did not return for the 2001 season.

References 

1999 establishments in the United States
2000 disestablishments in the United States
American auto racing teams
Brett Favre
Defunct NASCAR teams
Jarrett family
Auto racing teams disestablished in 2000
Auto racing teams established in 1999